The Macdonald Block Complex is a set of office buildings in Toronto, Ontario, Canada, that houses 12 cabinet ministers, 15 Ontario government ministries (as of 2016) and the largest concentration of Ontario public servants. Its address is 900 Bay Street, and is located just east of Queen's Park.

Layout
The complex consists of four towers:

The Ferguson Block: A 14-storey building that was completed in 1969, designed in the International Style by Shore Tilbe Henschel Irwin Architects and Engineers (now Shore Tilbe Irwin + Partners). The building is named for former Premier George H. Ferguson, and is located at 77 Wellesley Street West.
The Hearst Block is home to Ontario's provincial Ministry of Energy, Ministry of Tourism, Culture and Sport, and Ministry of Economic Development, Employment and Infrastructure. The building is named for former Premier William Howard Hearst.  It is ten storeys high. Designed by same firm as the Ferguson Block.
The Hepburn Block is home to various ministries, including the Ministry of Community and Social Services and the Ministry of Health and Long-Term Care. The 14-storey building is named for former Ontario Premier Mitchell Hepburn. Designed by same firm as the Ferguson Block in 1969.
The Mowat Block is 24 storeys high and is named after the third Premier of Ontario, Sir Oliver Mowat. Designed by same firm as the Ferguson Block in 1969.
The Macdonald Block is named after the first Premier of Ontario, Sir John Sandfield Macdonald. It was completed in 1968 (along with the Hepburn Block), and is located at 900 Bay Street.  This block is a podium that connects the four towers along the first two storeys of each and has a bridge to the first floor of Whitney Block from its second storey. It is designed by the same firm as the Ferguson Block.

History
The massive construction site for the MacDonald Block was the filming location for Buster Keaton's last film, "The Reporter", an industrial safety short that was released under the title The Scribe.

In July 2016, the Government of Ontario announced an eight-year reconstruction project of the entire complex.

Nearby government buildings
Other government buildings nearby include:
 Whitney Block
 Ontario Power Building
 Frost Building

References

 Ferguson Block
 Macdonald Block

Ontario government buildings
Buildings and structures in Toronto
Modernist architecture in Canada
International style architecture in Canada